The Strachan Challenge Series – Event 2 was a professional minor-ranking snooker tournament, that was held from 3 to 12 January 1993 at the Radion Plaxa Club in Sheffield, England.

The event was the second of three held in an effort to encourage some of the hundreds of new professionals who had joined the tour. These minor ranking events were open to all the pros but carried a much lower ranking points tariff, around ten per cent of that applicable to most of the other tournaments.
 
Troy Shaw won the tournament by defeating Nigel Bond nine frames to four in the final.


Main draw

References

1993 in snooker